This list of bridges in Italy lists bridges of particular historical, scenic, architectural or engineering interest. Road and railway bridges, viaducts, aqueducts and footbridges are included.

Historical and architectural interest bridges

Architectural bridges

Major road and railway bridges 
This table presents the structures with spans greater than 200 meters (non-exhaustive list).

Planned bridges

Notes and References 
 Notes

 

 

 Others references

See also 

 List of bridges in Rome
 List of bridges in Venice
 List of Roman bridges
 List of aqueducts in the Roman Empire
 Transport in Italy
 Rail transport in Italy
 Autostrade of Italy
 State highway (Italy)
 Geography of Italy
 Italian architecture

External links

Further reading